Bagaré is a department or commune of Passoré Province in north central Burkina Faso. Its capital lies at the town of Bagaré.

Towns and villages

The department has one town (populations updated in 2006):

  (2438 inhabitants)

and 23 villages:

  (61 inhabitants)
  (1131 inhabitants)
  (1341 inhabitants)
  (951 inhabitants)
  (428 inhabitants)
  (1013 inhabitants)
  (1514 inhabitants)
 Kalla (476 inhabitants)
  (689 inhabitants)
  (1364 inhabitants)
  (351 inhabitants)
 Korro (fr) (1709 inhabitants)
  (435 inhabitants)
  (1365 inhabitants)
  (747 inhabitants)
  (408 inhabitants)
  (799 inhabitants)
  (659 inhabitants)
  (686 inhabitants)
  (994 inhabitants)
  (657 inhabitants)
  (568 inhabitants)
  (2984 inhabitants)

References

Departments of Burkina Faso
Passoré Province